Nuno Borges and Francisco Cabral were the defending champions but lost in the final to Julian Cash and Henry Patten.

Cash and Patten won the title after defeating Borges and Cabral 6–3, 3–6, [10–8] in the final.

Seeds

Draw

References

External links
 Main draw

Maia Challenger - Doubles